Lednia is a monotypic genus, containing the single species Lednia tumana (the meltwater stonefly)—a rare, alpine, aquatic insect that is endangered due to likely loss of glaciers and snowpacks in the Glacier National Park and other habitat in the Rocky Mountains due to climate change. The differentiation from the other Nemourids is to look at the abdominal stremite which only the Lednia and paranemoura lack the vesicles of the 9th abdominal stermite.  The insect lives in the coldest streams just downstream of the glacier or snowbank sources and is considered as an early warning indicator species of climate warming in mountain ecosystems.The way the aquatic insects  in this case Lednia tumana is able to use biochemical and physiological strategies in order to dimmish cold stress which allows them to survive colder climates 
The Fisheries and Wildlife Service is being petitioned to protect the species under the U.S..Endangered Species Act.

References

External links
Specter of Climate Change Looms Large for Rare Insect in Glacier National Park (with photo).

Nemouridae
Plecoptera genera
Insects of North America
Fauna of the Rocky Mountains
Monotypic insect genera